Jiří Lipták (born 30 March 1982 in Brno) is a Czech trap shooter. He competed in the trap event at the 2012 Summer Olympics and placed 18th in the qualification round. Lipták won the gold medal in the Men's Trap event at the 2020 Summer Olympics.

References

External links

1982 births
Living people
Czech male sport shooters
Olympic shooters of the Czech Republic
Shooters at the 2012 Summer Olympics
Sportspeople from Brno
European Games competitors for the Czech Republic
Shooters at the 2015 European Games
Shooters at the 2019 European Games
Shooters at the 2020 Summer Olympics
Medalists at the 2020 Summer Olympics
Olympic medalists in shooting
Olympic gold medalists for the Czech Republic
Trap and double trap shooters